Marburg is a settlement in the Ugu District Municipality in the KwaZulu-Natal province of South Africa and a suburb of Port Shepstone. Marburg was a Norwegian settlement given the name Marburg for a nearby German mission. The Norwegian founders played a significant role in the development of Marburg and Port Shepstone. The British colonial government gave the settlers a free voyage to South Africa and also houses and 100 acres of land. Marburg was the only successful Scandinavian settlement in South Africa.

Today it is a suburb of Port Shepstone and was established in 1882 by Norwegian immigrants. It is likely named after Marburg, a city 74 km north of Frankfurt in Germany.

History

Norwegian founding
The Land and Immigration Board contemplated bringing German settlers to the Marburg area in 1881, but met opposition from the German government. Consequentially, immigration agent Walter Peace suggested promoting settlement in Marburg by Norwegians. On July 20, 1882, the first Norwegians ventured aboard the steamship Lapland for their 39-day voyage from Hull, England to Mzimkulu near Port Shepstone, South Africa. Arriving in Africa on August 28, 1882, the Norwegians were brought ashore the following day. The 246 Norwegians onboard Lapland were first and foremost fishermen, but slowly adjusted to the agrarian lifestyle at their 100-acre agricultural Marburg community.

Many of the original 1882 founders later left Marburg, including ten families which left for Australia. However, a number remained in South Africa though not all remained in Marburg. A number joined the Norwegian community in Durban, while others went to Johannesburg and other parts near Alfred County.

Emigration to South Africa from Norway in 1876-85 was dominated by emigrants from Romsdal, and more specifically, from Sunnmøre. Marburg's founders were first and foremost from Ålesund in Sunnmøre.

When Marburg settlers celebrated their 50th anniversary in 1932, there were twenty Norwegian families left in town. 84 original settlers were still alive, and the Norwegian community had produced 208 children, 425 grandchildren, and 130 great-grandchildren.

Apartheid era 
In 1950, the Group Areas Act. racially divided Port Shepstone similar to many other towns and cities in South Africa in which Marburg was classified as the "Indian area" of Port Shepstone. Marburg was one of the four Indian proclaimed townships in the KwaZulu-Natal province and its neighbouring suburb of Merlewood to the west was classified as the "Coloured area" of Port Shepstone.

Geography 
Marburg lies on a hilly topography about 52 meters above sea level just west of Port Shepstone and is bordered by the N2 South Coast Toll Road/Highway to the east. Marburg is situated approximately 3 kilometres west of Port Shepstone's Central Business District (CBD) and 112 kilometres south-west of the city of Durban.

Industries
Marburg is the largest industrial node within the KwaZulu-Natal South Coast as well as the automotive hub of the region. Industries ranging in Marburg include scrapyards, panelbeaters, mechanics and motor repair centres. Other evidence of the industrialism within Marburg are the warehouses that sprawl across the area.

Road transport 
Marburg is located on the N2 national route and just west of the Marburg Interchange (Exit 45 off-ramp) where the N2 from Harding and Kokstad in the west turns northwards at the off-ramp towards Durban in the north-east. The Marburg Interchange is also where the N2 and R61 highway (to Margate and Port Edward in the south-west) intersect and where the Oribi Toll Plaza is located. 

Smaller arterial routes through Marburg include the Main Harding Road which links the N2 to the Port Shepstone CBD and the Izotsha/Oscar Borchers Road which links Marburg to Izotsha, Gamalakhe and Southbroom in the south-west, Albersville and Protea Park in the north and further to the Umzimkhulu Sugar Mill in the north-west.

References 

Populated places in the Ray Nkonyeni Local Municipality